The 2005 African Youth Championship was an international football competition that took place between 15 and 29 January 2005. The tournament was hosted by Benin and also served as qualification for the 2005 FIFA World Youth Championship.

Qualification

Preliminary round
Burundi and Mauritius withdrew. As a result, the Republic of Congo and Lesotho advanced to the next round.

|}

First round
Republic of Congo, Congo Kinshasa, Ethiopia, Gabon and Tanzania withdrew. As a result, Cameroon, Nigeria, Zambia, Ghana and Zimbabwe advanced to the next round.

|}

Second round
Niger were disqualified by the FIFA. Accusations were made to each other from Lesotho and Zimbabwe of using over-aged players, but no actions were taken.

|}

Squads

The following teams qualified for the tournament:
 
  (host)

Group stage

Group A

Group B

Knock-out Stage

Semifinals

Third place match

Final

Qualification to World Youth Championship
The four best performing teams qualified for the 2005 FIFA World Youth Championship.

Goalscorers

Murder of Samiou Yessoufou
After Benin lost 3-0 to Nigeria on the opening day, Benin fans became outraged with goalkeeper Samiou Yessofou believing he was to blame for their loss. So they broke into a hotel bar just as Yessofou was beginning to drink alcohol for the first time. They grabbed glass bottles and smashed them on him and stabbed with a knife and tortured him with beating sticks. Then they left the bar causing Yessofou to fall the floor and he died. However, this did not stop the tournament which continued as normal and Benin went on to win a bronze medal later on.

References

Africa U-20 Cup of Nations
Youth
2005 in youth association football
2005 in Benin